Ina Phillips Williams (February 24, 1876 - March 23, 1934) was an American politician who served as a member of the Washington House of Representatives from 1917 to 1919. She represented Washington's 20th legislative district as a Republican.

Early life and education

Williams was born Ina May Phillips in Tuscumbia, Missouri on February 24, 1876. When she was 10, she was orphaned and moved with her siblings to live with an uncle in Prosser, Washington. By the age of 15, she had begun teaching school.

In 1897, at the age of 20 or 21, she married Wallis B. Williams, a Yakima Valley orchardist. The 1910 census recorded five children (daughters aged 11, 8, 6, and 4, and a one-year-old son), as well as a servant.  Wallis is listed as a milling company manager.

Political career
Williams won election to the state House of Representatives and represented the 20th District as a Republican for one term, from 1917 to 1919.

Third party politics
Before and after finding electoral success as a Republican, Williams was engaged in liberal third party politics.  She was a delegate for Theodore Roosevelt to the 1912 Progressive National Convention.  She also served on the national executive committee of the Committee of 48, a liberal political association founded in 1919, with the ultimately unsuccessful hope of launching a third political party in opposition to increasingly conservative Republican and Democratic politics.

In August, 1920, she represented the Farmer-Labor Party in a "triangular political discussion" alongside congressional candidate E.K. Brown (representing the Republicans) and the honorable J.J. Miller representing the Democrats.  The event in Wapato drew "an immense crowd from all parts of Yakima County."

Personal life 
Williams was an enthusiastic gardener, even helping found gardening clubs around the Yakima Valley.  She also served as president of the Yakima Woman's Century Club, an organization founded in 1894 as the Woman's Club that furthered women's civic, social, and literary engagement.

The 1920 census lists Wallis as a fruit farmer. Neither the 1910 nor 1920 census lists an occupation for Ina, and her death certificate says she was a housewife for 30 years.

Death and legacy 
Williams died of metastatic breast cancer on March 23, 1934, at the age of 58. She is buried at Tahoma Cemetery in Yakima.

See also
 1912 Progressive National Convention
 Committee of 48

References

External links
 Yakima Woman's Century Club
 Central Washington University biography podcast on Williams
 1917 publication from the Washington Secretary of State showing Williams as a 1919 Republic primary candidate for Congress from the Fourth Congressional District, and successful election results (from 1916 or 1918?) for state House
 Google Books result showing unsuccessful run for state legislature as Progressive
 Google Books result with some history of Williams's house and a meeting there with Theodore Roosevelt

1876 births
1934 deaths
Republican Party members of the Washington House of Representatives
Women state legislators in Washington (state)
People from Miller County, Missouri
People from Yakima, Washington
Central Washington University alumni
Washington (state) Progressives (1912)
Washington (state) Farmer–Laborites
20th-century American politicians
20th-century American women politicians